National Route 228 is a national highway of Japan connecting Hakodate, Hokkaidō and Esashi, Hokkaidō in Japan, with a total length of 151.5 km (94.14 mi).

References

National highways in Japan
Roads in Hokkaido